This article lists the most significant events and works of the year 1720 in music.

Events 
April – The Royal Academy of Music, a company formed for Handel in London, begins to produce operas.
Giovanni Bononcini arrives in London, his home until 1732, and becomes one of Handel's most notable rivals.
Benedetto Marcello's satirical attack on opera, Il teatro alla moda, is published anonymously in Venice.
Domenico Scarlatti arrives in Lisbon.

Publications 
Jan Josef Ignác Brentner – Horae Pomeridianae
George Frideric Handel - Suite de Pièces pour le clavecin, a work including the famous set of variations known as The Harmonious Blacksmith.
Marin Marais – Sonnerie de Ste-Geneviève du Mont-de-Paris
James Paisible – Six setts of aires for two flutes & a bass...
Alessandro Scarlatti – Messa di Santa Cecilia

Classical music 
Johann Sebastian Bach
Prelude for Lute in C minor
Sonatas and Partitas for Solo Violin

Opera
Antonio Maria Bononcini – Nino
George Frideric Handel – Radamisto
Johann David Heinichen – Flavio Crispo
Leonardo Leo – Caio Gracco
Giovanni Porta – Numitore
Antonio Vivaldi – La verità in cimento

Births 
January 1 – Johann Christoph Altnickol, composer (baptized January 1, 1720)
January 4 – Johann Friedrich Agricola, composer (died 1774)
August 20 – Bernard de Bury, court musician and composer (died 1785)
October 17 – Maria Teresa Agnesi, singer and composer (died 1795)
November 16 – Carlo Antonio Campioni, composer (died 1788)
date unknown
Henry Hargrave, composer (died 1780) 
William Savage, singer, organist and composer (died 1789)
probable
Gioacchino Cocchi, composer (died 1804) 
Bernhard Joachim Hagen, composer (died 1787)
Joan Baptista Pla, oboist and composer (died 1773)
Johann Georg Schürer, composer (died 1786)

Deaths 
July 7 – Maria Barbara Bach, first wife of Johann Sebastian Bach (born 1684)
July 27 – Johann Samuel Welter, composer
date unknown
Sridhara Venkatesa Ayyaval, Hindu saint and composer (born 1635)
Jean Hotteterre, musician and composer
José Peyró, composer (born c.1670)
Demoiselle Conradi, German opera singer
probable
Antonia Bembo, singer and composer (born c. 1640)
Jean Baptiste Loeillet of Ghent, composer (born 1688)
Guillaume Minoret, composer (born c.1650)
Johann Speth, organist and composer (born 1664)

 
18th century in music
Music by year